The ComiColor Cartoon series is a series of 25 animated short subjects produced by Ub Iwerks from 1933 to 1936. The series was the last produced by Iwerks Studio; after losing distributor Metro-Goldwyn-Mayer in 1934, the Iwerks studio's senior company Celebrity Pictures (run by Pat Powers) had to distribute the films itself. The series was shot exclusively in Cinecolor.

Most of the ComiColor entries were based upon popular fairy tales and other familiar stories, including Jack and the Beanstalk, Old Mother Hubbard, The Bremen Town Musicians, and The Headless Horseman.

Production 
Grim Natwick, Al Eugster, and Shamus Culhane were among the series' lead animators/directors, and a number of the shorts were filmed using Iwerks' multiplane camera, which he built himself from the remains of a Chevrolet automobile.

Filmography

Copyright status

Home media 
All of the ComiColor cartoons are now available in the 2004 Region 2 ComiColor DVD set released by Mk2/Lobster in France. Many are available in Region 1, in particular on the Cartoons That Time Forgot series.

Steve Stanchfield of Thunderbean will release the restored versions of the shorts on a Blu-ray/DVD set called ComiColor Cartoons Collection.

See also 
 The Golden Age of American animation
 Cartune Classics
 Color Classics – a series of animated short films produced by Fleischer Studios for Paramount Pictures from 1934 to 1941
 Color Rhapsodies
 Happy Harmonies
 Merrie Melodies
 Rainbow Parade
 Silly Symphonies
 Swing Symphony
 Puppetoons

References

Other sources 
 Leslie Iwerks and John Kenworthy, The Hand Behind the Mouse (Disney Editions, 2001) and documentary of the same name (DVD, 1999)
 Jeff Lenburg, The Great Cartoon Directors (Da Capo Press, 1993)

Ub Iwerks Studio series and characters
Film series introduced in 1933
American animation anthology series
Cinecolor films
Metro-Goldwyn-Mayer animated short films
Anthology film series